Sanzhi District is a rural district in northern New Taipei, Taiwan. It is notable as the hometown of the former president Lee Teng-hui.

History
During the period of Japanese rule, and was governed under  of Taihoku Prefecture.

Administrative divisions
The district administers thirteen urban villages:
Baxian, Putou, Guzhuang, Xinzhuang, Puping, Maochang, Hengshan, Xiban, Houcuo, Fude, Yuanshan, Dianzi and Xinghua  Village.

Education
 Mackay Medical College
 New Taipei Municipal Sanzhi Junior High School

Tourist attractions
 Li Tien-lu Hand Puppet Historical Museum

Transportation 
The main road route through Sanzhi is the Provincial Highway No. 2. There are also a number of county-level highways within the district.

Notable natives
 Chiang Wen-yeh, musician and composer active mainly in Japan and the People's Republic of China
 Lee Teng-hui, former ROC president, spiritual leader of the Taiwan Solidarity Union
 Lu Hsiu-yi, former Democratic Progressive Party politician and member of the Legislative Yuan
 Tseng Wen-hui, former First Lady of the Republic of China, wife of former President Lee Teng-hui
 Tu Tsung-ming, founder of Kaohsiung Medical University and the first Taiwanese PhD

See also
 New Taipei City

References

External links

  
 Abandoned San-Chih UFO Houses in Google Map
 Abandoned San-Chih UFO Houses on Flickr

Districts of New Taipei